Velika Hoča is a village in the municipality of Rahovec, in Kosovo. It is one of the Serb enclaves in Kosovo, and houses some 13 Orthodox church buildings, most of which date to the Serbian Middle Ages.

Velika Hoča is situated in the historical region of Metohija (Dukagjin) and is one of the oldest settlements. It was given as metochion by Stefan Nemanja to Hilandar in 1198–99 (Charter of Hilandar). 

In the Middle Ages, Velika Hoča was a strong economical and spiritual centre with 24 churches and three monasteries. 8 monasteries and five ruins have been preserved from that period. The Dečani wine is made from vineyards in Velika Hoča since at least the reign of Emperor Stefan Dušan (r. 1331-1355).

Demographics

Agriculture
The main economic activity of Velika Hoča is viniculture.

Culture
Velika Hoča is a significant cultural centre of Serbs in Kosovo. The village is noted for its 13 churches, some dating from the 12th century and reign of Serbian Grand Prince Stefan Nemanja, others from the 14th to 16th centuries. There are also several tower houses, one that belonged to Lazar Kujundžić.

List of churches
Church of St. Nicholas, Velika Hoča
Church of St. John, Velika Hoča
Church of St. Stephen, Velika Hoča
Church of the Holy Sunday, Velika Hoča
Church of Parascheva, Velika Hoča
Church of St. Luke, Velika Hoča
Church of St. Anne, Velika Hoča
Church of St. Basil, Velika Hoča
Church of the Holy Apostle Peter, Velika Hoča
Church of the Virgin Mary, Velika Hoča
Church of the Prophet Elijah, Velika Hoča
Church of the Holy Archangel Gabriel, Velika Hoča
Church on Rid

Annotations

References

Further reading

External links

 Blago Fund's Photo Collections of Serbian Medieval Churches in Velika Hoča 

Serbian enclaves in Kosovo
Villages in Orahovac
Serbian Orthodox church buildings in Kosovo
Serbian Orthodox monasteries in Kosovo
12th-century establishments in Serbia
Nemanjić dynasty endowments
Medieval sites in Serbia
Wine regions of Serbia
Medieval Serbian sites in Kosovo
Cultural heritage of Kosovo